Victory Day ( Bijôy Dibôsh) is a national holiday in Bangladesh celebrated on 16 December to commemorate the defeat of the Pakistan Armed Forces in the Bangladesh Liberation War in 1971 and the Independence of Bangladesh. It commemorates the Pakistani Instrument of Surrender, wherein the commander of the Pakistani Forces, General AAK Niazi, surrendered to the Mukti Bahini and their Indian allies, ending the nine-month Bangladesh Liberation War and 1971 Bangladesh genocide and marking the official secession of East Pakistan to become the new state of Bangladesh.

This day and event is also commemorated across India as the "Vijay Diwas" to honor Indians and Bangladeshis who laid down their lives in the war.

History 

In 1971 Bangladesh fought the Bangladesh Liberation War against Pakistan to become an Independent country, which resulted in the secession of East Pakistan from the Islamic Republic of Pakistan and established the sovereign nation called Bangladesh. The war pitted East Pakistan and India against West Pakistan, and lasted for a duration of nine months. One of the most violent wars of the 20th century, it witnessed large-scale atrocities, the exodus of 10 million refugees and the killing of 3 million people by the Pakistani armed forces.

On 16 December 1971, Lieutenant General Amir Abdullah Khan Niazi, CO of Pakistan Armed Forces located in East Pakistan signed the Instrument of Surrender. The Instrument of Surrender was a written agreement that enabled the surrender of the Pakistan Eastern Command in the Bangladesh Liberation War, and marked the end of the Indo-Pakistani War of 1971 in the Eastern Theater.

The surrender took place at the Ramna Race Course in Dhaka on 16 December 1971. Lieutenant General Amir Abdullah Khan Niazi and Lieutenant General Jagjit Singh Aurora, Joint Commander of Indian and Bangladesh Forces, signed the instrument amid thousands of cheering crowds at the racecourse. Air Commodore A. K. Khandker, Deputy Commander-in-Chief of the Bangladesh Armed Forces, and Lieutenant General J F R Jacob of the Indian Eastern Command, acted as witnesses to the surrender. Also present were Vice-Admiral Mohammad Shariff, commander of the Pakistani Naval Eastern Command and Air Vice-Marshal Patrick D. Callaghan of the Pakistan Air Force's Eastern Air Force Command, who signed the agreement. On behalf of Bangladesh, Air Commodore A. K. Khandker acted as witness to the surrender. Lieutenant Jacob Rafael Jacob, Chief of Staff of the Indian Eastern Command, along with the other commanders of Indian naval and air forces, acted as witnesses on behalf of India. Aurora accepted the surrender without a word, while the crowd on the race course started shouting anti-Nazi and anti-Pakistan slogans.

In 1996, the Bangladesh Bank issued a 10 Taka note with an overprint commemorating Victory Day's Silver Jubilee (the 25th anniversary).

Recognition of Bangladesh 

The Surrender of Pakistan Armed Forces marked the end of the Bangladesh Liberation War and the creation of Bangla Desh (later reduced to a single word). Most United Nations member nations were quick to recognise Bangladesh within months of its independence.

Celebration 
The celebration of Victory Day has been taking place since 1972. The Bangladesh Liberation War became a topic of great importance in cinema, literature, history lessons at school, the mass media, and the arts in Bangladesh. The ritual of the celebration gradually obtained a distinctive character with a number of similar elements: Military Parade by the Bangladesh Armed Forces at the National Parade Ground, ceremonial meetings, speeches, lectures, receptions and fireworks displays. Victory Day in Bangladesh is a joyous celebration in which popular culture plays a great role. TV and radio stations broadcast special programs and patriotic songs. The main streets are decorated with national flags. Different political parties and socioeconomic organisations undertake programs to mark the day in a befitting manner, including the paying of respects at Jatiyo Smriti Soudho, the national memorial at Savar in Dhaka District.

Military parade 
The day's highlight is the national holiday parade on Dhaka's National Parade Ground, hosted by the Bangladesh Armed Forces and involves personnel from the Bangladesh Police, Border Guard Bangladesh, Bangladesh Jail and Bangladesh Ansar. Presided by the President of Bangladesh in his capacity as Commander in Chief through the Armed Forces Division, it has been held since the 1970s as the principal national celebrations of the victory of the Bangladeshi people against the government of Pakistan, assisted by the Indian Armed Forces, and as such it is the principal holiday of the Armed Forces. A televised event with nationwide radio simulcast provided by Bangladesh Television and Radio Bangladesh, it is the country's main military parade event of the year and is one of the biggest annual military parades in South Asia.

Expanded summary 

Before around 10am, a division-sized formation of around 18,000 personnel of the armed forces and law enforcement organisations, which had already been assembled on the parade ground, alongside a 4,000 strong mobile column amounting to around 400 vehicles, and a massed military bands and pipe bands contingent numbering around 1,200 musicians, awaits the arrival of the President, as the Prime Minister, who also serves as Minister of Defence concurrently, and the Principal Staff Officer of the AFD/BAF, usually a lieutenant general, both arrive at the parade grandstand in the center of the grounds together with the service commanders and commanding officers of the law enforcement services, together with ministers of the state cabinet, including the Minister of Liberation War Affairs, the Speaker of the Jatiya Sangsad and MPs, the Chief Justice of the Supreme Court of Bangladesh, the Attorney General, living veterans of the Liberation War of 1971 and family members of those killed in action and deceased veterans, chairmen of state agencies and defense sector firms, the general public, representatives of state and private industries and veterans of the armed forces and law enforcement organisations are stationed in between the major dignitaries who are stationed in the central grandstand. One battalion at the center of the formations assembled carries the National Standards (the Flag of Bangladesh with the gold fringe and the Bengali title of the unit) which serve as the principal colour of all Armed Forces formations, while each of the other battalions sans the first three, which are massed colour guard battalions, have 15 colour bearers at the front of their units.

At 10am the massed bands' fanfare trumpeters and trumpeters sound the presidential fanfare, signalling the arrival of the President, escorted by an Army mounted squadron and escort motorcycles of the Police. As the President leaves his vehicle, he is greeted by the important dignitaries and upon arriving at the central grandstand the Parade Commander, usually an Army major general, leads the parade in rendering a full presidential salute as while the national anthem Amar Sonar Bangla is played by the Massed Bands alongside the firing of a 21-gun salute. As the music ends, the parade executes order arms, following this the PC informs the President of the readiness of the parade for the review. Both, together with aides-de-camp (one each from the Armed Forces and Police) and the PSO, ride an open-top Land Rover to inspect the parade formations. Upon approach of the parade formations the massed bands, under the baton of the Senior Director of Music of the Armed Forces (usually a lieutenant colonel or colonel) play a slow march as the President reviews each of the battalions of the ground column. As the music ends the President and the PSO, together with the PC, leave the inspection vehicle as the former two return to the parade grandstand.

Following the conclusion of the inspection of the line the PC, after having ordered the parade to shoulder arms, then informs the president for the commencement of the march past in the following manner:

Mr. President, may I now ask your permission for the commencement of the parade march past, sir.

The approval having now granted the PC, upon returning to his place in the parade, orders the parade to executive the left turn, after which the colour bearers now turn to take their places in the right flank ranks of the formation together with the leading officer of the battalions. Following this the commander of the National Standards colour guard orders the battalion to turn on the march, taking its place in the formation as the PC rides his vehicle. Following the order to quick march the parade begins with the fly past of aircraft from both the Bangladesh Army Aviation Group and Bangladesh Naval Aviation, both recently founded formations, and the transport planes of the Air Force, as the massed bands play Notuner Gaan. As the parade commander and his second in command approach the grandstand in their vehicles, the two officers, together with their adjutants, salute on the eyes right. They are followed by the infantry battalions, and followed on by a double past of parachute special forces personnel, which had jumped from an Air Force transport plane into the parade ground during the march past, and then by the mobile column and fly past of Air Force fighter  and trainer aircraft as well as helicopters.

Order of parade march past in quick time 
 Massed colour guard regiment of formation colours of the armed forces (three battalions)
 Veterans of the Liberation War
 1st Battalion, President Guard Regiment
 Battalion from the Armoured Corps
 Regiment from the Infantry Corps
 Battalion from the East Bengal Regiment
 Battlaion from the Bangladesh Infantry Regiment
 Bangladesh Regiment of Artillery
 Bangladesh Corps of Engineers
 Bangladesh Signals Corps
 National Standards colour guard
 Composite battalion of army service support branches
 Para-Commando Brigade Battalion
 Battalion of army servicewomen
 Navy
 Air Force
 Bangladesh National Cadet Corps
 Border Guard Bangladesh
 Bangladesh Police
 Bangladesh Ansar
 Bangladesh Jail
 Battalion of female Police and Ansar servicewomen
 Infantry battalion wearing modern combat equipment and rifles
 Army K-9 company and Army and Police combined mounted squadron

Events commemorating Victory Day 
1971: State Bank of Pakistan became Bangladesh Bank.
1972: The constitution of the People's Republic of Bangladesh was enacted on 16 December.
1973: Gallantry awards of war were declared by Bangladesh Gazette on 15 December.
1996: Silver jubilee of victory was celebrated.
2013: New world record of the largest human flag was set when 27,117 volunteers gathered at the National Parade Ground holding red and green blocks to form the national flag of Bangladesh.

See also 
 Independence Day
 Evolution of Pakistan Eastern Command plan
 Indo-Pakistani wars and conflicts
 Military plans of the Bangladesh Liberation War
 Mitro Bahini order of battle
 Vijay Diwas (India)
 Victory Day in other countries.

References 

Aftermath of the Bangladesh Liberation War
Victory days
Public holidays in Bangladesh
Annual events in Bangladesh
December observances